The Carbonera pupfish (Cyprinodon fontinalis), also known as the Perrito de carbonera, is a small, endangered species of pupfish in the family Cyprinodontidae. It is endemic to springs and associated waters at Bolsón de los Muertos in northwestern Chihuahua, Mexico. It was last rated by the IUCN in 1996 where considered endangered, but most subpopulations now appear to be extirpated, while a few are extinct in the wild (still survive in captivity). In 2012, it only survived in the wild in a single spring (having once occurred in nine), which also was the last remaining habitat for the largemouth shiner (Cyprinella bocagrande) and the dwarf crayfish Cambarellus chihuahuae. As this single spring was declining, it was decided to move some individuals of all three species to a nearby refuge in 2014 as a safeguard.

References

Cyprinodon
Pupfish, Carbonera
Pupfish, Carbonera
Fauna of the Chihuahuan Desert
Pupfish, Carbonera
Pupfish, Carbonera
Taxa named by Michael Leonard Smith
Taxa named by Robert Rush Miller
Fish described in 1980
Taxonomy articles created by Polbot